The D.I.C.E. Award for Immersive Reality Game of the Year is an award presented annually by the Academy of Interactive Arts & Sciences during the academy's annual D.I.C.E. Awards. This award recognizes "the single game released on an immersive reality platform that best utilizes the attributes of the platform to entertain users. Elements of design, direction, and narrative are factored into the title selection."

The most recent winner was Red Matter 2, which was developed and published by Vertical Robot.

Winners and nominees

2010s

2020s

Multiple nominations and wins

Developers and publishers 
Oculus Studios, now known as Reality Labs, has published the most nominees, so far, and is the only publisher, so far, with multiple wins. Ready at Dawn is the only developer so far to have developed multiple winners.

Franchises
Lone Echo is the only franchise so far to have won more than once.

References 

D.I.C.E. Awards
Awards established in 2017